"Oh My Darling, Clementine" is a traditional American western folk ballad in trochaic meter usually credited to Percy Montross (or Montrose) (1884), although it is sometimes credited to Barker Bradford.

Members of the Western Writers of America chose it as one of the Top 100 Western songs of all time.

Synopsis
Multiple variations of the song exist, but all center on Clementine, the daughter of a "miner forty-niner" and the singer's lover. One day while performing routine chores, Clementine trips and falls into a raging current and drowns, as her lover is unable to swim and declines to attempt to rescue her. In Montross's version, the song ends somewhat farcical by noting he will not go so far as necrophilia: "Though in life I used to hug her, now she's dead – I'll draw the line."

History and origins
The lyrics were written by Percy Montross in 1884, based on an earlier song called "Down by the River Liv'd a Maiden", printed in 1863. The origin of the melody is unknown. In his book South from Granada, Gerald Brenan claims that the melody was from an old Spanish ballad, made popular by Mexican miners during the California Gold Rush. It was best known from Romance del Conde Olinos o Niño, a sad love story very popular in Spanish-speaking cultures. It was also given various English translations. No particular source is cited to verify that the song he used to hear in the 1920s in a remote Spanish village was not an old text with new music, but Brenan states in his preface that all the information in his book has been checked reasonably well.

It is unclear when, where, and by whom the song was first recorded in English, but the first version to reach the Billboard charts was that by Bing Crosby recorded on June 14, 1941, which briefly reached the No. 20 spot. It was given an updated and up-tempo treatment in an arrangement by Hal Hopper and John Scott Trotter. The re-written lyrics include a reference to Gene Autry ("could he sue me, Clementine?") amongst the five swinging verses.

Notable versions
There have been numerous versions of the song recorded over the years.

Bobby Darin version
Bobby Darin recorded a version of the song in 1960, with lyrics credited to Woody Harris, in which Clementine is reimagined as a 299-pound woman. After she falls into the water, Darin suggests that Clementine could be mistaken for a whale and calls out to those on the high seas to watch for her, in a rhythm and style reminiscent of Darin's rendition of "Mack the Knife": "Hey you sailor, way out in your whaler, with your harpoon and your trusty line, if she shows now, yell... there she blows now. It just may be chunky Clementine."

Jan and Dean version
Jan and Dean had a hit with "Clementine", charting as high as 65 on the Billboard Hot 100. It was released on the Dore label (SP DORE 539 (US)) in November, 1959; "You're on My Mind" was the B Side.

Tom Lehrer version
Tom Lehrer recorded a set of variations on the song in 1959 on his live album An Evening Wasted with Tom Lehrer, demonstrating his theory that "folk songs are so atrocious because they were written by the people." He performs the first verse in the style of Cole Porter, the second in the style of "Mozart or one of that crowd", the third in a disjointed bebop sound parodying the style of Beat Generation musicians like Slim Gaillard or Babs Gonzales, and the final verse in the style of Gilbert and Sullivan.

Other versions
In 1998, English musician Dario G sampled the melody in his track "Carnival de Paris". The song was recorded for the 1998 FIFA World Cup in France.
 Television host Jack Narz recorded the song for his 1959 album Sing the Folk Hits With Jack Narz.
 The American pop singer, actress, and top-charting female vocalist Connie Francis added her interpretation of the ballad into the 1961 album Connie Francis Sings Folk Song Favorites.
 In 2004, the song was recorded by Westlife on their Allow Us to Be Frank.
 The song is referenced in the lyrics of two separate songs by Elliott Smith. The first, "Clementine", from his 1995 self-titled album. The second, "Sweet Adeline", appears three years later on XO.
 Megan Washington recorded "Clementine" in 2010. The song references some of the lyrics from the original.
 In 2012, Neil Young and Crazy Horse recorded a minor-key hard-rock version of "Clementine" on their album Americana.

In popular culture

Film
 The song plays during the opening credits for John Ford's 1946 movie My Darling Clementine, with Henry Fonda. It also runs as a background score all through the movie.
 In the 1952 MGM cartoon studio short film Magical Maestro the cartoon character Butch, as a canine opera singer named the Great Poochini, is transformed by a magician into a country singer who sings the main verse of the song.
 In the 1963 film Hud starring Paul Newman, the song is played prior to the start of a movie being watched by two characters, who join in on the singing. 
 The 1990 film Back to the Future Part III features this song, arranged by Alan Silvestri and ZZ Top. 
 Henry Casey (Scott Bairstow) briefly sings this song while he and White Fang sail across the river in the 1994 film White Fang 2: Myth of the White Wolf.
 In the 2004 film Eternal Sunshine of the Spotless Mind, there are two references to the song (specifically its use by Huckleberry Hound): one at the beginning and one at the end, both regarding the name of Clementine (Kate Winslet). Joel (Jim Carrey) mentions the song to Clementine when they introduce themselves, and Clementine sings the chorus to Joel on a train to Montauk.
In the 2022 movie Murder at Yellowstone City, gold prospector Robert Dunnigan (Zach McGowan) anachronistically sings the song as he makes his way home after celebrating striking gold, just before he is shot and murdered. This movie is set in 1881, three years before the song is dated (1884).

Television
 In 1985, Akimi Yoshida published a Japanese manga series called Banana Fish, the song is sung by military soldiers and later on mentioned by a side character called Shorter.
 In 1992, Peter Brooke, Secretary of State for Northern Ireland, sang "Darlin' Clementine" on The Late Late Show on Ireland television. Just hours earlier, eight people (seven of them civilians) had been killed in the Teebane bombing. Brooke was forced to resign shortly after.
 In the 2001 Columbo episode "Murder With Too Many Notes", Lieutenant Columbo, played by Peter Falk, sings the first verse of the song along with Billy Connolly's character Findlay Crawford. Columbo also sings the song in the 1978 episode "Make Me A Perfect Murder.
 Released on 15 May 2020, the fifth season of the series Outlander offers two versions of the song : the first one on episode 7, by character Brianna Randall Fraser (voice), played by British actress Sophie Skelton; the second one on episode 8, by character Roger Wakefield (voice + guitar), played by Scottish actor Richard Rankin. Along with the typical chorus, only 4 verses of the song are played ("In a cavern, in a canyon [...]"; "Light she was and like a fairy [...]"; "Drove she ducklings to the water [...]"; "Ruby lips above the water [...]"). These versions were composed by American Composer Bear McCreary.
 A mangled rendition of "Darling Clementine" is animated coonhound Huckleberry Hound's signature tune, sung in most episodes of the cartoon series The Huckleberry Hound Show. But it often ends up as "Oh my darling what's her name".
 Released in 2020, the Netflix original Korean drama, It's Okay to Not Be Okay, also features this song. It is performed multiple times through the episodes, both as a melody and as simple lyrics.
 In the Season 5 M*A*S*H episode "Movie Tonight," aired February 22, 1977, character Colonel Potter, played by Harry Morgan, sings the lyrics, "In a cavern in a canyon excavating for a mine..." during the last scene of the episode while the crew is performing surgery on wounded soldiers. The rest of the crew joins in on a sing-along. The episode ends when they all sing the lyric, "Dreadful sorry, Clementine."  This occurs after the 4077th M*A*S*H views the 1946 John Ford classic film "My Darling Clementine".
 In 1999, Jeri Ryan and Robert Picardo sing a bit of the song while the Holo Doctor reprograms one of Seven of Nine's Borg implants.
In late 2022, the song was used in an anti-smoking commercial by the New York State Department of Health.

Use of melody
 The melody is used in "Xīnnián Hǎo", a New Year and Chinese New Year song.
 The melody is used in "Dip The Apple In The Honey", a Jewish new years song.
 The melody was applied to "Erika", a German Nazi marching song. (However, the original version used by the military did not use this melody.)
In the 1956 Hindi film C.I.D., the melody of this song was used in the song "Yeh Hai Bombay Meri Jaan".
 The chorus to Cher Lloyd's 2011 single "Swagger Jagger" was seen as heavily borrowed from the melody of "Oh My Darling Clementine"
 The melody is used in "Picked a Strawberry", a library storytime song made by the librarian duo called Jbrary.
The melody is used in the song "There Are Seven Days (In A Week)", from Barney & Friends.
The melody is used by a popular Malaysian nursery rhyme called "Bangun Pagi".
The melody is used by Flanders and Swann in the penultimate verse of their song "Misalliance".
The melody is used by Kenneth Williams in his song "The Ballad of the Woggler's Moulie".

Other
 In the 1945 novel Animal Farm by George Orwell, the pig Old Major explains his dream of an animal-controlled society, and ends by singing Beasts of England. The song's tune is described in the novel as sounding like a combination of "La Cucaracha" and "Oh My Darling, Clementine".
 The Clementine plutonium-fueled fast-neutron reactor, the first of its type, was built at Los Alamos in 1946 and named after the song, due to the use of "49" as a code word for plutonium-239.
 The 1994 NASA Clementine mission to test sensors and spacecraft components and make scientific observations of the Moon was named after the song.
 In the first episode of the 2018 video game The Walking Dead: The Final Season, a character named Louis plays this song to the coincidentally-named Clementine on his piano.
 In the 2018 video game Red Dead Redemption II, some NPCs can be heard whistling the tune of this song in Saint Denis. One of the main characters, John Marston, also sings a snippet of this if he is either drunk or idle.
 The 1982 video game Miner 2049er uses the tune as title screen music.
 In The Hunger Games prequel novel The Ballad of Songbirds and Snakes by Suzanne Collins, the song is performed by the character Maude Ivory.
 There is a parody "The Climbing Clementine", which starts "In a crevice high on Nevis".

References

External links

 
 MIDI sound file
 Short radio episode "Clementine" from California Legacy Project.

19th-century songs
American folk songs
California Gold Rush
American children's songs
Jan and Dean songs
Traditional children's songs
Vaudeville songs
Huckleberry Hound
Western music (North America)
Year of song unknown